Nikola Ilievski - Djidji  (Macedonian: Никола Илиевски - Џиџи, born 16 December 1954) is a football coach and former player from North Macedonia.

Playing career

Club
Born in Skopje, during his playing career he played with FK Ohrid, FK Vardar, FK Rabotnichki, FK Priština and FK Radnički Pirot in Yugoslavia and with Kastoria F.C. in Greece.

Managerial career 
After finishing the coaching degree in the Faculty of Physical Culture in the University of Belgrade he started his coaching career. He was coach of the North Macedonia national football team from 2002 to 2003. He spent two spells as manager of FK Pobeda, leading them into the UEFA Cup in 2000 and to the 2003–04 Macedonian First League won championship.

In January 2013 Ilievski was appointed as the new manager of FK Vardar after a dismissal of Blagoja Milevski, although interested the club's rival FK Pelister, but on 13 April, after a loss in Eternal derby against Pelister, was resigned due to underperforming in the league.

In January 2015, he signed with Persijap Jepara.

Managerial honours 
FK Pobeda
Winner
 Macedonian First League: 2003–04
 Macedonian Cup: 2001–02

NK Celje
Runner-up
 Slovenian Cup: 2005–06

Managerial Statistics

References

External links 
 

1954 births
Living people
Footballers from Skopje
Association football midfielders
Macedonian footballers
Yugoslav footballers
FK Vardar players
FK Rabotnički players
FK Pobeda players
FK Ohrid players
FK Teteks players
FC Prishtina players
Kastoria F.C. players
FK Radnički Pirot players
FK Metalurg Skopje players
Yugoslav First League players
Yugoslav Second League players
Super League Greece players
Yugoslav expatriate footballers
Expatriate footballers in Greece
Yugoslav football managers
Macedonian football managers
FK Rabotnički managers
FK Kumanovo managers
FK Metalurg Skopje managers
FK Belasica managers
FK Skopje managers
NK Celje managers
FK Pobeda managers
North Macedonia national under-21 football team managers
North Macedonia national football team managers
SCM Râmnicu Vâlcea managers
KF Bylis Ballsh managers
Bangladesh national football team managers
FK Vardar managers
KF Renova managers
Kategoria Superiore managers
Macedonian expatriate football managers
Expatriate football managers in Slovenia
Macedonian expatriate sportspeople in Slovenia
Expatriate football managers in Romania
Macedonian expatriate sportspeople in Romania
Expatriate football managers in Albania
Macedonian expatriate sportspeople in Albania
Expatriate football managers in Bangladesh
Macedonian expatriate sportspeople in Bangladesh
Expatriate football managers in Indonesia
Macedonian expatriate sportspeople in Indonesia